Maël Renouard (born 1979 in Paris) is a French writer and translator.

Biography 
A former student at the École Normale Supérieure and agrégé in philosophy, Maël Renouard taught philosophy at the Paris-1 Panthéon-Sorbonne University between 2002 and 2006 and at the École Normale Supérieure between 2006 and 2009, as an attaché temporaire d'enseignement et de recherche.
 
From 2009 until 2012, he was technical advisor responsible for speeches in the cabinet of François Fillon, then Prime Minister of France.

He has translated Nietzsche, Joseph Conrad, Arthur Schnitzler among others.

A decree dated 16 January 2014 made him a chevalier of the Ordre des Arts et Lettres.

Film 
Renouard regularly wrote for the magazine  between 2004 and 2010 and made a cameo in Frontier of the Dawn by Philippe Garrel in 2008.

Works 
2002: L'Œil et l'Attente. Sur Julien Gracq, Chambéry, Éditions Comp’Act, series "La bibliothèque volante", 
2009: Yves Bonnefoy, image et mélancolie, inks by Isabelle Raviolo, Paris, La Dame d'onze heures, 
2013: La Réforme de l'opéra de Pékin, Paris,  — Prix Décembre 2013
2016: Fragments d'une mémoire infinie, Paris, Grasset, coll. « Figures ».
2018: Notes sur Lascaux, Saint-Loup-de-Naud, Éditions Du Sandre, 
2020: L'historiographe du royaume, Paris, Grasset,

References

External links 
 
 Website of the author
 Numéro 3 de la revue Charles, in which Maël Renouard retales his experience of ghostwriter for François Fillon

21st-century French novelists
Prix Décembre winners
École Normale Supérieure alumni
German–French translators
Ghostwriters
Chevaliers of the Ordre des Arts et des Lettres
Writers from Paris
1979 births
Living people
Translators of Friedrich Nietzsche